Sabari Express (numbered:17229/17230) is the most prestigious express train operated by South Central Railway zone of the Indian Railways, operated between  and . Earlier the train used to run between Hyderabad Deccan and Cochin Harbour Terminus railway station.

Etymology 

The train is named after famous Hindu pilgrimage site Sabarimala.
This is one of the most important and prestigious trains of Indian Railways.

Important Halting stations 

Thiruvananthapuram Central

Ernakulam Town (North)
Thrissur railway station
Shornur Junction
Ottapalam

Erode Junction

Chittoor
Tirupati,

Nellore
(Singarayakonda)
Ongole
Chirala
Bapatla
Nidubrolu

Guntur Junction
Miryalguda
Nalgonda

Traction
From Tiruvananthapuram central to Shoranur Junction hauls Vijayawada Electric Loco Shed Based WAP 4 and Shoranur Junction To Secunderabad Junction hauls Lallaguda  Electric Loco Shed BaseD WAP 7.

References 

Transport in Hyderabad, India
Transport in Thiruvananthapuram
Named passenger trains of India
Rail transport in Kerala
Rail transport in Telangana
Express trains in India
Rail transport in Tamil Nadu
Rail transport in Andhra Pradesh